The Ecosystem Management Decision Support (EMDS) system is an application framework for knowledge-based decision support of ecological analysis and planning at any geographic scale.

EMDS integrates state-of-the-art geographic information system (GIS) as well as logic programming and decision modeling technologies on multiple platforms (Windows, Linux, Mac OS X) to provide decision support for a substantial portion of the adaptive management process of ecosystem management.

EMDS has used Criterium DecisionPlus from InfoHarvest, Inc. and NetWeaver from Rules of Thumb, Inc. as core analytical engines since 2002. The NetWeaver component performs logic-based evaluation of environmental data, and logically synthesizes evaluations to infer the state of landscape features such as watersheds (e.g., watershed condition). The DecisionPlus component prioritizes landscape features with respect to user-defined management objectives (e.g., watershed restoration), using summarized outputs from NetWeaver as well as additional logistical information considered important to the decision maker(s). See the #Applications section below for a current list of published papers by application area.

Several citations provide extensive background on the EMDS system and its potential applications.

EMDS 5.0 was released in October 2014.

Development partners 
EMDS was originally developed by the United States Forest Service. The Redlands Institute of the University of Redlands developed and maintained EMDS from 2005 until mid 2014 when the university closed the Redlands Institute. Support and development of EMDS was then transferred to Mountain View Business Group where one of the principal programmers was able to find a new home. Development continues with support from Rules of Thumb, Inc. and InfoHarvest, Inc..  Logic Programming Associates (London, UK) joined the EMDS development group in 2013, bringing their expertise in Prolog programming into the mix. An area of immediate interest for further research and development based on this new expertise is the possibility for implementing natural language generators in EMDS that can interact with the analytical products and maps from NetWeaver and CDP, and render all of this complexity into easy-to-understand executive summaries. The most recent addition to the EMDS development group is BayesFusion, LLC, which brings a customized version of its SMILE engine for running GeNIe Bayesian network applications to the EMDS environment.

Applications  
 EMDS, the book (March 2014).
 Carbon sequestration
 Conservation
 Design and siting of ecological reserves
 Ecosystem resilience
 Ecosystem services
 Ecosystem sustainability
 Forest management
 Geodesign 
 Hydrology
 Invasive species
 Land classification
 Landscape evaluation
 Landscape restoration 
 Pollution
 Social issues in natural resource management
 Soil impacts
 Urban growth and development
 Watershed analysis
 Wetlands management 
 Wildlife habitat management 
 Wildland fire danger
 Wildland fire suppression

Citations

External links 
 EMDS Homepage
 Rules of Thumb, Inc.
 InfoHarvest, Inc.
 Logic Programming Associates
 BayesFusion LLC
 EMDS talk at 2010 GeoDesign Summit
 EMDS webinar presented by EBM Tools

GIS software